CHOD-FM, branded as 92.1 GO FM, is a radio station licensed to Cornwall, Ontario, which currently operates from studios in Casselman. Owned and operated by the Radio communautaire Cornwall-Alexandria cooperative, it is a non-profit community radio station. The station was licensed by the Canadian Radio-television and Telecommunications Commission on February 24, 1993 and officially launched on May 1, 1994.

On March 26, 2012, Radio communautaire Cornwall-Alexandria Inc., received CRTC approval to change the authorized contours of the French-language community radio programming undertaking CHOD-FM Cornwall by increasing the average effective radiated power (ERP) from 19,200 to 34,167 watts (maximum ERP of 45,600 to 60,000 watts), by changing the class from B to C1, by increasing the effective height of antenna above average terrain from 39 to 106.7 metres and by changing the transmission site.

In October 2016, the station's studios moved to Casselman, in order to better serve and expand in all of its territory.

On October 16, 2020, the CRTC approved an application by Radio communautaire to change CHOD-FM's frequency at Cornwall from 92.1 MHz (channel 221B) to 91.9 MHz (channel 220A), and by decreasing the maximum effective radiated power (ERP) from 45,600 to 1,000 watts and the average ERP from 19,200 to 420 watts. All other technical parameters were unchanged.

On January 9, 2023, the station became 92.1 GO FM.

Rebroadcasters

On April 18, 2017, Radio communautaire Cornwall-Alexandria Inc. submitted an application to add a new FM transmitter at Dunvegan, Ontario, to rebroadcast the programming of CHOD-FM Cornwall. On September 13, 2017, the CRTC approved Radio Communautaire's application to operate a new transmitter at 92.1 MHz near Dunvegan with a proposed callsign CHOD-FM-1.

Notes
The station is a member of the Alliance des radios communautaires du Canada.

Former logo

References

External links
FM 92.1
 

Hod
Hod
Hod
Radio stations established in 1994
1994 establishments in Ontario